Quarto Trabacchini (1949 – 11 June 2021) was an Italian politician who served as a Deputy.

References

1949 births
2021 deaths
Italian politicians
Deputies of Legislature X of Italy
Deputies of Legislature XI of Italy
Italian Communist Party politicians
Democratic Party of the Left politicians
People from Viterbo